The yellow-breasted apalis (Apalis flavida) is a species of bird in the family Cisticolidae.

Taxonomy 
The brown-tailed apalis (A. flavocincta) was formerly considered conspecific, but was split as a distinct species by the IOC in 2021.

Range
It is found in Angola, Benin, Botswana, Burkina Faso, Burundi, Cameroon, Central African Republic, Chad, Republic of the Congo, DRC, Ivory Coast, Eswatini, Ethiopia, Gabon, Gambia, Ghana, Guinea, Guinea-Bissau, Kenya, Malawi, Mali, Mozambique, Namibia, Nigeria, Rwanda, Sierra Leone, Somalia, South Africa, South Sudan, Tanzania, Togo, Uganda, Zambia, and Zimbabwe.

Habitat
Its natural habitats are subtropical or tropical dry forest, subtropical or tropical moist lowland forest, dry savanna, and moist savanna.

References

External links

Image at ADW

 Yellow-breasted apalis - Species text in The Atlas of Southern African Birds.

yellow-breasted apalis
Birds of Sub-Saharan Africa
yellow-breasted apalis
Taxonomy articles created by Polbot